Holophagus is an extinct genus of coelacanth belonging to Latimeriidae. The type species, Holophagus gulo, is known from the Lower Jurassic marine Lias of England. A similar form, referred to as cf. Holophagus, has been reported from the Early Cretaceous Las Hoyas site of Spain.

References 

Prehistoric lobe-finned fish genera
Jurassic bony fish
Latimeriidae
Jurassic fish of Europe